Eupithecia forsterata is a moth in the family Geometridae. It is found in Iran.

References

Moths described in 1960
forsterata
Moths of the Middle East